The International Billiards & Snooker Federation (IBSF) is an organisation that governs non-professional snooker and English billiards around the world. As of January 2020, the organisation is headquartered in Doha, Qatar.

History
The World Billiards and Snooker Council (WB&SC) was established in 1971, following a meeting of a number of national associations at a hotel in Malta during the World Amateur Billiards Championship. The associations were dissatisfied that the Billiards and Snooker Control Council was controlling both the UK and international games. Player and journalist Clive Everton served as the first secretary, and his office served as the first office of the WB&SC. In 1973, the WB&SC renamed itself as the International Billiards and Snooker Federation (IBSF) and began to control non-professional billiards and snooker championships.

Aims and structure
The aims and objectives of the IBSF are to "co-ordinate, promote and develop the sports of billiards and snooker on a non-professional level" and to manage the competitions.

By the end of 1984, the IBSF had thirty countries as members. As of January 2020, the IBSF has seventy-three affiliated countries categorised into one of the five Olympic regions: Africa, Americas, Asia, Europe and Oceania. The IBSF board of directors has four executive officers (president, vice-president, secretary, and treasurer) plus two representatives from each Olympic region. The executive officers are responsible for the day-to-day running of the Federation and are answerable to IBSF members at the annual general meeting, which is normally held during the period of the IBSF World Snooker Championships.

Events
IBSF World Snooker Championship (Men - Women) Since 1963 M / 2003 W
IBSF World 6-Red snooker Championships (Men - Women) Since 2013 M & W (https://de.wikipedia.org/wiki/IBSF_6-Red-Snooker-Weltmeisterschaft)
IBSF World 6-Red Cup (Men - Women) Since 2020 W / 2021 M
IBSF World 15-Red Snooker Championships Men Since 
IBSF World Team Snooker Championship (Men - Women) Since 
IBSF World Under-21 Snooker Championship (Men - Women) Since 1987 M / 2015 W
IBSF World Under-18 Snooker Championship (Men - Women) Since 2015 M & W
World Open Under-16 Snooker Championships (Men - Women) Since 2017 M & W
IBSF World Masters Snooker Championships (Seniors) Since 2004 (https://de.wikipedia.org/wiki/IBSF-Senioren-Snookerweltmeisterschaft)
IBSF World Masters Team Snooker Championships (Seniors) Men Since 
IBSF World Para Snooker Championships Men Since 
IBSF World Billiards Championship (Long-Up - 150-Up - Timed - Points) (Men - Women) Since 1926 M / 2015 W

Regions
49 Nations:

 Africa: 3 Nations
 Asia (Asian Confederation of Billiard Sports): 21 Nations
 Europe (European Billiards and Snooker Association): 21 Nations
 Oceania: 2 Nations
 Americas (Pan America Billiards & Snooker Association): 2 Nations

Relationships to other organisations
The IBSF—alongside the World Professional Billiards and Snooker Association (WPBSA)—was one of the two snooker-focused organisational members of the World Confederation of Billiards Sports (WCBS). The WCBS is an organisation that promotes cue sports in the form of carom, pool and snooker; one of its aims is to gain the acceptance of cue sports disciplines into the Olympic Games.

The WPBSA terminated its relationship with the IBSF on 31 July 2017, over conflicts involving the two organisations' relative leadership positions within WCBS, making allegations of IBSF misconduct. As a result of the split, the WPBSA has revoked the Professional Main Tour cards that were once afforded to the IBSF World Men's and World Under-21 Champions. On 5 October 2017, WPBSA announced the formation of the World Snooker Federation (WSF), with stated goals similar to those of WCBS but with a focus on amateur and professional snooker, and an invitation for regional and national amateur snooker federations to join WSF.

As the IBSF and WPBSA were unable to come to a formal agreement, as required by the WCBS, both had their WCBS membership terminated in December 2018. In March 2019, the IBSF was reinstated to the WCBS to represent snooker.

See also

Organ
 World Professional Billiards and Snooker Association
 World Snooker Federation
 World Women's Snooker
 World Billiards
 World Confederation of Billiards Sports
 World Pool-Billiard Association
 Union Mondiale de Billard
 Billiards World Cup Association
 International Carrom Federation
 Women's Billiards Association

Events
 List of snooker tournaments
 World Snooker Tour
 World Snooker Championship
 World Women's Snooker Championship (1976-Ongoing)
 Women's Professional Snooker Championship (1934-1950)
 World Seniors Championship
 World Seniors Tour
 World Billiards Championship (English billiards)
 World Women's Billiards Championship (1931-Ongoing)
 Women's Professional Billiards Championship (1930-1950)
 Six-red World Championship

Types
 Cue sports
 Snooker
 Six-red snooker
 Billiards
 Pocket billiards
 Three-cushion billiards
 Carom billiards
 Russian pyramid
 Carrom

References

External links
IBSF official website

Snooker governing bodies
Sports organizations established in 1971
Organisations based in Dubai